Neisha Bernard-Thomas (born 21 January 1981) is a Grenadian middle-distance runner who specializes in the 800 metres. She also ran collegiately at Louisiana State University (LSU).

Her personal best is 2:00.09 minutes, achieved at the 2008 Summer Olympics in Beijing. This is the Grenadian record. She also holds the 1500 metres record with 4:23.24 minutes, achieved in March 2008 in Baton Rouge.

Competition record

References

1981 births
Living people
Grenadian female middle-distance runners
LSU Lady Tigers track and field athletes
Athletes (track and field) at the 2003 Pan American Games
Athletes (track and field) at the 2006 Commonwealth Games
Athletes (track and field) at the 2008 Summer Olympics
Athletes (track and field) at the 2012 Summer Olympics
Pan American Games competitors for Grenada
Commonwealth Games competitors for Grenada
World Athletics Championships athletes for Grenada
Olympic athletes of Grenada